Isabelle M. Germano is a neurosurgeon and a tenured professor of neurosurgery, neurology, and oncology at the Icahn School of Medicine at Mount Sinai Hospital (in New York City). She is a Fellow of the American College of Surgeons and the American Association of Neurological Surgeons. She is also an author. Germano has worked in image-guided brain and spine surgery.

Education and post-doctoral training
After an undergraduate education with concentration in Latin and ancient Greek literature, she graduated from the University of Turin Medical School in 1984 with a thesis in neuro-pathology, and also completed a neurology residency. She completed her surgical internship at the University of California San Francisco and neurosurgery residency at UCSF and the Albert Einstein College of Medicine. During her residency, she obtained training in epilepsy surgery at the University Hospital of Zürich, Switzerland. After her chief resident year, she completed a fellowship in epilepsy surgery, stereotaxy, and movement disorders under André Olivier at Montreal Neurological Institute.

Professional career
Germano joined the neurosurgery faculty at Mount Sinai in 1992 to develop the brain tumor and stereotactic clinical programs. She is the director of the comprehensive tumor program and co-director of the radiosurgery program there. She has worked in the field of image-guided brain and spine surgery  developing new technology for several years and for the last 10 years directed a practical course for neurosurgeons around the world to teach about it until it became standard-of-care. These technological advances are used to perform minimally invasive surgery for patients with brain tumors, epilepsy, Parkinson's disease, movement disorders, and spine disease or tumors. 
Germano established a basic science laboratory within the neurosurgery department to focus on brain tumors translational research with particular emphasis on gene therapy, stem cells, and induced pluripotent stem cells (iPSC).

A member of many neurosurgery societies and an author, she has served on the executive committee of the Congress of Neurological Surgeons (CNS), on the board of directors of the American Association of Neurological Surgeons (AANS), on the executive committee of the AANS/CNS Joint Section on Tumors, as a scientific program member for the AANS, CNS, and the American Epilepsy Society (AES). She is a past-president of Women in Neurosurgery (WINS).
Germano’s clinical interests include newly diagnosed or recurrent brain and spine tumors, brain mapping and monitoring, gliomas, metastasis, meningiomas, brain and spine radiosurgery, epilepsy surgery, and problems of the cervical and lumbar spine.

Germano has written several articles and papers.

Honors and awards
 2000 - Best Doctors of New York Hall of Fame
 2014 - Leksell Radiosurgery Award

Publications

Books
 Germano IM (Editor). Advanced Techniques in Image-Guided Brain and Spine surgery. 2002, Thieme Publishers, New York, NY, pages 233 Library of Congress 
 Germano IM (Editor). LINAC and Gamma Knife Radiosurgery.  American Association of Neurological Surgeons Press, Park Ridge, IL, pages 295. Library of Congress  
 Germano IM (Editor). Neurosurgery Treatment of movement Disorders. American Association of Neurological Surgeons Press, Park Ridge, IL, pages 275 Library of Congress

Papers

 Web based pathology assessment in RTOG 98-04 
 Mormone E, D’Souza S, Alexeeva V, Bederson M, Germano IM. “Footprint-free” human induced  Pluripotent Stem Cell-derived astrocytes for in vivo cell-based therapy. Stem Cells and Dev [in press 2014] 
 Douglas AC, Wippold FJ 2nd, Broderick DF, Aiken AH, Amin-Hanjani S, Brown DC, Corey AS, Germano IM, Hadley JA, Jagadeesan BD, Jurgens JS, Kennedy TA, Mechtler LL, Patel ND, Zipfel GJ. ACR Appropriateness Criteria Headache.J Am Coll Radiol. 2014 Jul;11(7):657-67
 Lo SS, Gore EM, Bradley JD, Buatti JM, Germano IM, Ghafoori AP, Henderson MA, Murad GJ, Patchell RA, Patel SH, Robbins JR, Robins HI, Vassil AD, Wippold FJ 2nd, Yunes MJ, Videtic GM. ACR Appropriateness Criteria® Pre-Irradiation Evaluation and Management of Brain Metastases. J Palliat Med. 2014 Jun 27.
 Germano IM and Binello E. Stem cells and gliomas: past, present, and future. J Neuro-Oncology [in press, 2014]
 Binello E, Emdad l, Mormone E, Germano IM. Characterization of fenofibrate-mediated anti-proliferative pro-apoptotic effects on high-grade glioma and anti-invasive effects on glioma stem cells. J Neurooncol, 117(2):225-34, 2014. 
 Barthélemy EJ, Benjamin E, Jean-Pierre MY, Poitevien G, Ernst S, Osborn I, Germano IM. A prospective emergency department-based study of pattern and outcome of neurologic and neurosurgical diseases in Haiti. World Neurosurg. Oct 9. S1878-8750(13)01298-9, 2013 PIMD 24121294
 Binello E, Qadeer ZA, Kothari H, Emdad L,Germano IM. Stemness of the CT-2A Immunocompetent Mouse Brain Tumor Model:  Characterization in Vitro. Journal of Cancer, 3:166-174, 2012.   
 Binello E, Germano IM. Stem cells as therapeutic vehicles for the treatment of high-grade gliomas. Neuro Oncol, 14:256-265, 2012.   
 Emdad L, D’Souza, Qadeer ZA, Kothari HP, Germano IM. Efficient Differentiation of Human Embryonic and induced pluripotent Stem Cells into Functional Astrocytes. Stem Cells and Development, 21(3):404-4120, 2012.
 Patel S, Robbins JR, Gore EM, Bradley JD, Gaspar LE, Germano IM, et al. ACR Appropriateness Criteria: Follow-up and Retreatment of Brain Metastasis. Am J Clin Oncology, 35(3):302-306, 2012. 
 Binello E and Germano IM. Targeting glioma stem cells:  a novel framework for brain tumors. Cancer Sci, 102:1958-1966, 2011.   
 Binello E, Green S, Germano IM. Radiosurgery for high-grade glioma. Surg Neurol Int, 3(S2) 118-126, 2012   
 Patel S, Robbins JR, Gore EM, Bradley JD, Gaspar LE, Germano IM, et al. ACR Appropriateness Criteria Follow-up and Retreatment of brain Metastasis. Am J Clin Oncology, 2012 Jun;35(3):302-306 
 Emdad L, Qadeer ZA, Bederson LB, Kothari HP, Uzzaman M, Germano IM. Is there a common upstream link for autophagic and apoptotic cell death in human high grade gliomas? Neuro-Oncology, 13(7)725-35, 2011.  
 Germano IM, Emdad l, Qader Z, Binello E, Uzzaman M. Embryonic stem cell (ESC) –mediated transgene delivery induces growth suppression, apoptosis, radiosensitization, and overcomes temozolomide resistance in malignant gliomas. Cancer Gene Therapy 17(9):664 – 74, 2010. . 
 Germano IM, Swiss V, Casaccia P. Primary brain Tumors, Neural stem cells, and brain tumor cancer cells: where is the link? Neuro–pharmacology 58(6):903-10, 2010 
 Suh JH, Videtic GMM, Aref AM, Germano IM, Goldsmith BJ, Imperato JP, Marcus KJ, McDermott MW, McDonald MW, Patchell R, Robins HI, Rogers CL, Wolfson  AH, wippold FJ, Gaspar LP. ACR appropriateness Criteria: Single brain metastasis. Curr Probl Cancer. 34(3):162-74, 2010 
 Germano IM and Binello E. Gene therapy as an adjuvant treatment of malignant gliomas: from bench to bedside. J Neuro-Oncology 93:79-87, 2009.  
 Binello E, Germano IM. Tonsillary carcinoma after temozolomide treatment for glioblastoma multiforme: treatment-related or dual-pathology? J Neuro-Oncol 94(1): 145-8, 2009.   
 Uzzaman M, Keller G, Germano IM. In vivo Gene Delivery by embryonic stem cell-derived astrocytes for malignant gliomas. Neuro-Oncology, 11:102-108 2009.   
 Videtic GMM, Gaspar LE, Aref AM, Germano IM, Goldsmith BJ, Imperato JP, Marcus KJ, McDermott MW, McDonald MW, Patchell RA, Robins HI, Rogers CL, Suh JH, Wolfson AH, Wippold FJ. American College of Radiology appropriateness criteria on multiple brain metastases. J Rad Oncol Biol Physics 75:961-965, 2009
 
 Germano IM, Uzzaman M,  Keller G. Gene delivery by embryonic stem cells for malignant glioma therapy:  hype or hope?  Cancer Biology and Therapy 7(9): 1341-7, 2008.   
 Benzil D, Abosch A, Germano IM, Gilmer Holy, Maraire N, Muraszko K, Pannullo S, Rosseau G, Schwartz L, Todor, R, Ullman J, Zusman E. The future of neurosurgery: a white paper on the recruitment and retention of women in neurosurgery. J Neurosurgery 109: 367-375, 2008 
 Uzzaman M, Keller G, Germano IM. Enhanced pro-apotptotic effects of tumor necrosis factor-related apoptosis-inducing ligand (TRAIL) on temozolomide-resistant glioma cells. J Neurosurgery 106: 646-651, 2007.   
 Germano IM, Uzzaman M, Benveniste R, Zaurova M, Keller G. Apoptosis in human glioma cells  produced using embryonic stem cell-derived astrocytes expressing tumor necrosis factor-related apoptosis-inducing ligand (TRAIL). J Neurosurgery 105:88-95, 2006.   
 Uzzaman M, Benveniste R, Keller G,Germano IM. Embryonic stem cell-derived astrocytes: novel gene therapy vector for brain tumors. Neurosurgical Focus 19(3) E6, 2005. 
 Benveniste R, Keller G, Germano IM. Embryonic stem cell-derived astrocytes expressing drug-inducible transgenes: Differentiation and allotransplantation into the mouse brain. J Neurosurgery 103:115-123,2005. 
 Benveniste R. and Germano IM. Correlation of factors predicting intraoperative brain shift with successful resection of malignant brain tumors using image-guided techniques. Surg Neurol 63:542-549, 2005 
 Kanzawa T, Zhang L, Xiao L, Germano IM, Kondo Y, Kondo S. Arsenic trioxide induces autophagic cell death in malignant glioma cells by up-regulation of mitochondrial cell death protein BNIP3. Oncogene 24: 980-91, 2005. 
 Germano IM,Gracies JM, Weisz DJ,Tse W,Koller WC, Olanow CW. Unilateral stimulation of the subthalamic nucleus in Parkinson's disease- a double blind 12-month evaluation study. J Neurosurgery 101:36-42, 2004.

References

External links
 Mount Sinai profile
 Device tested to treat aggressive brain tumors
 CDI
 ACR Appropriateness Criteria Headache

Medical imaging
University of Turin alumni
Icahn School of Medicine at Mount Sinai faculty
American medical writers
Women medical writers
Living people
Women surgeons
Year of birth missing (living people)